Luis María López Rekarte (born 26 March 1962) is a Spanish former footballer who played mainly as a right back.

He amassed La Liga totals of 300 games and seven goals over 11 seasons, representing in the competition Deportivo (five years), Real Sociedad and Barcelona (three apiece) and winning six major titles.

Club career
Born in Mondragón, Basque Country, López Rekarte's first sport was track and field (with a personal best of 10.05 in the 100 metres). He made his professional debut in football with Deportivo Alavés amidst the massive financial difficulties the club endured, culminating with the relegation to the Segunda División B in 1983. Two years later, he signed with neighbouring Real Sociedad.

Forming a defensive quarter with legendary Alberto Górriz, Agustín Gajate and Juan Antonio Larrañaga, López Rekarte started for a side that won the Copa del Rey in 1987. The following year, they emerged runners-up in both domestic competitions.

López Rekarte joined FC Barcelona after losing the 1988 Spanish cup final to the La Liga giants, alongside teammates José Mari Bakero and Txiki Begiristain. Relatively used in his first two seasons, he featured rarely in Barças 1991 league conquest, all but one of his 13 appearances being as a used substitute. His greatest moment with the Catalans came in the final of the 1988–89 Cup Winners' Cup: brought in from the bench, he scored the decisive 2–0 to seal the win.

Being a crucial member of a rising Deportivo de La Coruña side soon dubbed Super Depor – he never played less than 25 matches during his spell at the Estadio Riazor – López Rekarte retired in 1997 at the age of 35 after another stint in Segunda División, now with RCD Mallorca.

International career
López Rekarte had four caps for Spain in 1988, the first coming in a friendly against East Germany on 27 January, in Valencia (0–0).

Personal life
López Rekarte was the older brother of another professional footballer, Aitor, who also played for Real Sociedad, also being a right back and an international. His niece, Maitane López, was also involved in the sport.

After retiring, he worked as Aitor's agent. He later engaged in mountaineering.

HonoursReal SociedadCopa del Rey: 1986–87BarcelonaLa Liga: 1990–91
Copa del Rey: 1989–90
UEFA Cup Winners' Cup: 1988–89Deportivo'
Copa del Rey: 1994–95
Supercopa de España: 1995

References

External links

1962 births
Living people
People from Mondragón
Spanish footballers
Footballers from the Basque Country (autonomous community)
Association football defenders
La Liga players
Segunda División players
Segunda División B players
Deportivo Alavés players
Real Sociedad footballers
FC Barcelona players
Deportivo de La Coruña players
RCD Mallorca players
Spain under-23 international footballers
Spain international footballers
Basque Country international footballers